Rockmount Association Football Club is an Irish association football club based in Whitechurch, County Cork.

Their senior men's team currently plays in the Munster Senior League. They have also competed in the FAI Cup, the League of Ireland Cup, the FAI Intermediate Cup and the Munster Senior Cup. They have previously played in the Cork Athletic Union League. The club also fields teams in various junior and youth leagues. Their schoolboy section regularly fields up to ten teams in the Cork Schoolboy's League.

History

Early years
Rockmount A.F.C. was formed in 1924 in the Commons Road area of Cork city.  The club was named after a local big house, Rockmount House, after the owner agreed to purchase some gear for the club. In 1924–25 the club entered a team in Cork City Minor League and in 1926–27 the club won its first trophy – the Munster Youth Cup. The 1926–27 season also saw the club enter a team in the Munster Junior League. Other members of this league included Cork Bohemians, Fordsons, Cobh Ramblers and Mallow United plus two clubs who shared their name with future League of Ireland clubs, Cork Celtic and Cork City. League success initially eluded Rockmount but they did win the Munster Junior Cup in both 1929–30 and 1932–33. In 1935 club activities were suspended. However Rockmount A.F.C. was revived in 1951–52, initially as a schoolboy team. In 1955–56, a junior team was also entered in the Cork Athletic Union League. Rockmount finished as runners up in the Cork AUL in 1959–60, 1965–66 and 1967–68 before they won the title in 1975–76. In 1967–68 they also won the Cork AUL's main league cup competition, the AOH Cup. In the final they defeated Everton 2–1 in a replay after the first game finished 3–3.

Provincial level
Rockmount later joined the Munster Senior League and during the 2000s and 2010s they emerged as one of the league's strongest teams, regularly winning the Senior Premier Division title. They won their first title in 1999–2000 and in 2014–15 they won their sixth. Rockmount have been Munster Senior Cup finalists on four occasions, each time losing out to League of Ireland opponents. In both 1997–98 and 2001–02 they lost out to Cork City. In 2008–09 they lost 2–1 to Waterford United. In the quarter-finals of the 2015–16 cup Rockmount drew 1–1 with Cork City before winning the tie 4–3 on penalties. In the semi-final they defeated Ringmahon Rangers 2–1 but then lost the final to Cobh Ramblers by the same score.

National cups
In 1986–87 Rockmount were FAI Cup quarter-finalists. In the round of 32 they defeated Monaghan United 3–1 away from home. In the round of sixteen they took two games to defeat Mervue United. After a 2–2 draw, Rockmount won the replay 1–0. In the quarter-finals they lost 2–0 to Dundalk. Rockmount were also quarter-finalists in the 2004 FAI Cup. In the round of sixteen they again knocked out Monaghan United, this time defeating them 2–0. In the quarter-finals they held Waterford United to a 2–2 draw at Waterford RSC before losing the replay 2–1. Rockmount have been FAI Intermediate Cup cup finalists on five occasions. In 1998–99 in their first final, they defeated Garda F.C. 2–0 at Turners Cross. Between 2002 and 2003 and 2004–05 they played in three successive finals. In the 2002–03 final they lost to 2–1 to Belgrove at Whitehall Stadium after a replay. In 2003–04 they won the cup for a second time after defeating Bluebell United in the final at Richmond Park. However, in 2004–05 they failed to retain the cup and lost 1–0 in the final to Wayside Celtic at the Carlisle Grounds. In 2007–08 Rockmount won the cup for a third time following a 2–0 win at Turners Cross over fellow Munster Senior League club, Douglas Hall. After winning the Munster Senior League title in 2014–15, Rockmount were invited to participate in the 2016 League of Ireland Cup. In the first round they lost 4–0 to Waterford United at the Waterford RSC.

Ground
Rockmount play their home games at Rockmount Park in Whitechurch, County Cork, about 12 kilometres north of Cork city centre. They previously played home games at rented facilities in Kilcully, before moving to their current home in 1983. Rockmount Park features four pitches. An all weather pitch was opened in 2010.

Notable former players
Republic of Ireland international
  Roy Keane
Republic of Ireland U21 international
  Shane O'Connor

Honours
Munster Senior League
 Winners: 1999–2000, 2001–02, 2005–06, 2007–08, 2010–11, 2014–15: 6
 Runners up: 2008–09, 2009–10, 2011–12: 3
FAI Intermediate Cup
Winners: 1998–99, 2003–04, 2007–08: 3
Runners up: 2002–03, 2004–05: 2
Munster Senior Cup
Winners: 2019-20: 1
Runners up: 1997–98, 2001–02, 2008–09, 2015–16: 4
Munster Junior Cup
Winners: 1929–30, 1932–33: 2
Munster Youth Cup
Winners: 1926–27: 1
Runners up: 1988–89: 1 
Cork Athletic Union League
Winners: 1975–76: 1
Runners up: 1959–60, 1965–66, 1967–68: 3 
AOH Cup
Winners: 1967–68: 1

References

External links
  Rockmount A.F.C. on Facebook
  Rockmount A.F.C. on Twitter

Munster Senior League (association football) clubs
Association football clubs in County Cork
Former Cork Athletic Union League clubs
1924 establishments in Ireland
Association football clubs established in 1924

lt:Rockmount AFC